Choreutis parva is a moth in the family Choreutidae. It was described by Pagenstecher in 1884. It is found on the Moluccas.

References

Natural History Museum Lepidoptera generic names catalog

Choreutis
Moths described in 1884